The Plusiini are the largest tribe of moths in the Plusiinae subfamily. At least one undescribed genus is known to exist.

Genera
Subtribe Autoplusiina Kitching, 1987
Erythroplusia
Macdunnoughia
Sclerogenia
Antoculeora
Loboplusia
Autoplusia
Notioplusia
Rachiplusia
Diachrysia
Allagrapha
Subtribe Euchalciina Chou & Lu, 1979
Euchalcia
Desertoplusia
Pseudochalcia
Polychrysia
Chrysanympha
Eosphoropteryx
Panchrysia
Pseudeva
Lamprotes
Plusidia

Subtribe Exyrina (disputed)
Exyra
Subtribe Plusiina Boisduval 1829
Autographa
Megalographa
Lophoplusia
Cornutiplusia
Syngrapha
Anagrapha
Plusia